Top Shotta is the debut studio album by American rapper NLE Choppa, released on August 7, 2020, by Warner Records. It was initially  set for release in early 2020, but was delayed due to the COVID-19 pandemic and Black Lives Matter protests. The production of the album was handled by several record producers, including CashMoneyAP, Javar Rockamore and TNTXD. It features guest appearances from Mulatto, Roddy Ricch, Chief Keef, and Lil Baby. The album debuted at number ten on the Billboard 200.

The album was promoted by six singles: "Shotta Flow 3", "Camelot", "Walk Em Down", "Shotta Flow 5", "Narrow Road", and "Make Em Say".

Critical reception

Top Shotta was met with mostly favorable reviews from music critics. NME awarded the album three out of five stars, criticizing the first half of the album for its lack of cohesiveness, but praising the album's second half for its more reflective subject matter, saying "He's only 18, and yet the rap protege here proves himself with a collection that balances his braggadocio and vulnerability to thrilling effect." Paste magazine gave the album a score of 7/10, saying "The young rapper's major-label debut, Top Shotta, is at its best when he's open, honest and emotional."

Track listing

Charts

Weekly charts

Year-end charts

Certifications

References

2020 debut albums
Warner Records albums
NLE Choppa albums